Kal Gah may refer to:
 Kal Gah, Chaharmahal and Bakhtiari
 Kal Gah, Fars
 Kal Gah, Kohgiluyeh and Boyer-Ahmad
 Kal Gah, Lorestan